Jack White (May 14, 1920 – November 23, 1988) was an American stock car racing driver who drove from 1949–1951. A native of Lockport, New York, he competed in the NASCAR Grand National Division, winning one race at Hamburg Speedway in the series' inaugural season of 1949.

References

External links

People from Lockport, New York
Racing drivers from New York (state)
NASCAR drivers
1920 births
1988 deaths